Brown County is a county in the U.S. state of Wisconsin. As of the 2020 census, the population was 268,740, making it the fourth-most populous county in Wisconsin. The county seat is Green Bay, making it one of three Wisconsin counties on Lake Michigan not to have a county seat with the same name. Brown County is part of the Green Bay, WI Metropolitan Statistical Area.

History

Brown County is one of Wisconsin's two original counties, along with Crawford County. It originally spanned the entire eastern half of the state when formed by the Michigan Territorial legislature in 1818. It was named for Major General Jacob Brown, a military leader during the War of 1812.

Several towns along the Fox River vied for the position of county seat in Brown County's early years. The first county seat was located at Menomoneeville (now a part of Allouez) in 1824. In 1837, a public referendum relocated the county seat to De Pere. The location was put up for the popular vote again in 1854, resulting in the establishment of the present county seat at Green Bay.

The oldest known tree in Wisconsin, a 1,300 year-old cedar growing on the Niagara Escarpment, was found in Brown County.

Geography

Major highways

Railroads
Watco
Canadian National
Escanaba and Lake Superior Railroad

Buses
Green Bay Metro
List of intercity bus stops in Wisconsin

Climate

Demographics

Birth related statistics
In 2017, there were 3,324 births, giving a general fertility rate of 65.6 births per 1000 women aged 15–44, which is above the Wisconsin average of 60.1. Additionally, there were 168 reported induced abortions performed on women of Brown County residence, with a rate of 3.3 abortions per 1000 women aged 15–44, which is below the Wisconsin average rate of 5.2.

2020 census

As of the census of 2020, the population was 268,740. The racial makeup of the county was 79.2% White, 3.2% Asian, 3.1% Black or African American, 2.8% Native American, 4.4% from other races, and 7.2% from two or more races. Ethnically, the population was 9.8% Hispanic or Latino of any race.

2010 census
At the 2010 census there were 248,007 people, 98,383 households, and 63,721 families living in the county. The population density was 403 people per square mile (156/km2). There were 104,371 housing units at an average density of 170 per square mile (66/km2).  The racial makeup of the county was 86.5% White, 2.2% Black or African American, 2.7% Native American, 2.7% Asian, 0.0004% Pacific Islander, 3.7% from other races, and 2.2% from two or more races. 7.3% of the population were Hispanic or Latino of any race.
Of the 98,383 households 31.0% had children under the age of 18 living with them, 50.0% were married couples living together, 10.2% had a female householder with no husband present, and 35.2% were non-families. 27.7% of households were one person and 8.9% were one person aged 65 or older. The average household size was 2.45 and the average family size was 3.02.

The age distribution was 24.1% under the age of 18, 10.8% from 18 to 24, 26.9% from 25 to 44, 26.6% from 45 to 64, and 11.6% 65 or older. The median age was 36.2 years. For every 100 females, there were 97.80 males. For every 100 females age 18 and over, there were 95.70 males.

2000 census

At the 2000 census there were 226,778 people, 87,295 households, and 57,527 families living in the county. The population density was 429 people per square mile (166/km2). There were 90,199 housing units at an average density of 171 per square mile (66/km2).  The racial makeup of the county was 91.14% White, 1.16% Black or African American, 2.29% Native American, 2.18% Asian, 0.03% Pacific Islander, 1.90% from other races, and 1.30% from two or more races. 3.84% of the population were Hispanic or Latino of any race. 33.8% were of German, 8.9% Polish, 7.8% Belgian and 6.8% Irish ancestry. 93.2% spoke only English at home, 3.8% spoke Spanish and 1.2% Hmong.
Of the 87,295 households 33.90% had children under the age of 18 living with them, 53.20% were married couples living together, 8.90% had a female householder with no husband present, and 34.10% were non-families. 26.50% of households were one person and 8.40% were one person aged 65 or older. The average household size was 2.51 and the average family size was 3.08.

The age distribution was 26.10% under the age of 18, 10.50% from 18 to 24, 31.90% from 25 to 44, 20.90% from 45 to 64, and 10.70% 65 or older. The median age was 34 years. For every 100 females, there were 98.90 males. For every 100 females age 18 and over, there were 96.90 males.

Government
The legislative branch of Brown County is the 26-member Board of Supervisors. Each member represents a single district and serves a two-year term, with elections held in the spring of even-numbered years. The Board of Supervisors elects a Chairman and Vice Chairman from its membership.

The executive branch of Brown County is the County Executive, who is elected in the spring of every other odd-numbered year. The executive appoints department heads with the approval of the County Board. The current county executive is Troy Streckenbach.

Brown County has several other elected officials that are established under the Wisconsin State constitution and are referred to as the "constitutional officers". Constitutional officers are the only partisan elected officials within Brown County government, as the Executive and County Board are non-partisan positions.

The current constitutional officers are:
 County Executive: Troy Streckenbach
 Clerk: Sandy Juno (R)
 Clerk of Circuit Courts: John Vander Leest (R)
 District Attorney: David L. Lasee (R)
 Register of Deeds: Cheryl Berken (R)
 Sheriff:  Todd Delain (R)
 Treasurer: Paul Zeller (R)

In July 2002, the county declared English its official language, voting 17–8 to do so and to increase spending to promote fluency in English.

Communities

Cities
 De Pere
 Green Bay (county seat)

Villages

 Allouez
 Ashwaubenon
 Bellevue
 Denmark
 Hobart
 Howard (partly in Outagamie County)
 Pulaski (partly in Shawano County and Oconto County)
 Suamico
 Wrightstown (partly in Outagamie County)

Towns

 Eaton
 Glenmore
 Green Bay (town)
 Holland
 Humboldt
 Lawrence
 Ledgeview
 Morrison
 New Denmark
 Pittsfield
 Rockland
 Scott
 Wrightstown

Census-designated places
 Dyckesville
 Greenleaf

Unincorporated communities

 Anston
 Askeaton
 Bay Settlement
 Benderville
 Buckman
 Champion
 Chapel Ridge
 Coppens Corner
 Edgewater Beach
 Fontenoy
 Glenmore
 Henrysville
 Hollandtown
 Humboldt
 Kolb
 Kunesh
 Langes Corners
 Lark
 Little Rapids
 Mill Center
 Morrison
 New Franken
 Pine Grove
 Pittsfield (partial)
 Poland
 Red Banks
 Shirley
 Sniderville (partial)
 Sugar Bush
 Wayside
 Wequiock

Native American communities
 Oneida Nation of Wisconsin (partial)

Ghost towns/Neighborhoods
 Fort Howard
 Preble

Adjacent counties
 Oconto County – north
 Door County – northeast, shares a short water border within Green Bay 
 Kewaunee County – east
 Manitowoc County – southeast
 Calumet County – southwest
 Outagamie County – west
 Shawano County – northwest

Green Bay, center, is the seat of Brown County. The city of Oconto (half cut off at the bottom right) is the county seat of Oconto County. Slightly above and much further right of Oconto is Oconto Falls, also in Oconto County. The somewhat larger city above Oconto Falls is Pulaski, which is in Brown County at the very border with Shawano County. Shawano County extends between Pulaski and past the edge of the photograph.

The large city in the top right is Appleton, the county seat of Outagamie County. To the left of Appleton and across the northern edge of Lake Winnebago is Brillion in Calumet County.

The village directly to the left of Green Bay and its immediate suburbs is Denmark, in Brown County. The smaller communities above and slightly to the left of Denmark (including Cooperstown, Maribel, and Kellnersville) are in Manitowoc County.

Luxembourg (larger village in lower left) and Casco (half cut off at lower far left) are in Kewaunee County.

Politics
Since 1968, Brown County has voted for the Republican presidential candidate in all but two elections, 1996 and 2008. Democratic strength is concentrated in the city of Green Bay, while the suburban and rural areas typically vote Republican. Brown County is the only county home to an NFL stadium that voted for Donald Trump in 2020.

See also
 National Register of Historic Places listings in Brown County, Wisconsin

References

Further reading
 Commemorative Biographical Record of the Fox River Valley Counties of Brown, Outagamie and Winnebago. Chicago: J. H. Beers, 1895.
 Martin, Deborah B. History of Brown Country Wisconsin: Past and Present. 2 vols. Chicago: S. J. Clarke, 1913. Vol. 1 Vol. 2

External links
 Brown County website
 Brown County map from the Wisconsin Department of Transportation
 Northeast Wisconsin Historical County Plat Maps & Atlases

 
1818 establishments in Michigan Territory
Populated places established in 1818
Green Bay metropolitan area